Barata de primavera is a Mexican telenovela produced by Valentín Pimstein for Televisa in 1975.

Cast 
Jacqueline Andere as Leticia Reyes
Enrique Lizalde as Eduardo Lozano
Verónica Castro as Karina Labrada
Saby Kamalich as Adriana
María Teresa Rivas as Laura Palmer
Lupita Lara as  Gabriela Cortes
Carmen Salas as Angelica
Mario Sauret as José
Hector Gómez as Nacho
Guillermo Murray as Gustavo Silva
Carlos Piñar as Hector Lomeli
Maricruz Olivier as Marcela Grey
Joaquín Cordero as Alberto Neri
Connie de la Mora as Diana
Juan Antonio Edwards as Carlos
Cristina Moreno as Vanessa
Miguel Córcega as Luis Guzman
Alicia Montoya as Nana Licha
Tony Carbajal as Arturo de Lama
Rocío Banquells as Patricia
Aurora Cortes as Angelica's friend
Silvia Caos as Martha
Jorge Ortiz de Pinedo as Roberto
Julio Monterde as Gonzalo Alcocer
Carlos Monden as Javier
Aurora Molina as Graciela
Aldo Monti as Fernando
Miguel Maci as Germano de la Lama
Otto Sirgo as Antonio
Javier Marc as Enrique
Alma Delfina as Marisa

References

External links 

Mexican telenovelas
1975 telenovelas
Televisa telenovelas
Spanish-language telenovelas
1975 Mexican television series debuts
1976 Mexican television series endings